Procambarus pictus, sometimes called the Black Creek crayfish or spotted royal crayfish, is a species of crayfish in family Cambaridae. It is endemic to Florida, where it is found in the Black Creek river system, the St. Johns River, and the upper Etoniah Creek.

Appearance 
This species of crayfish has yellow to white stripes and spots on a black carapace, with its abdomen consisting of black and rust colored bands.

References

Cambaridae
Endemic fauna of Florida
Freshwater crustaceans of North America
Crustaceans described in 1940
Taxa named by Horton H. Hobbs Jr.
Taxonomy articles created by Polbot